Sunflower is a 1970 Italian drama film directed by Vittorio De Sica. It was the first western movie to be filmed in the USSR. Some scenes were filmed near Moscow, while others near Poltava, a regional center in Ukraine.

Plot 

"A woman born for love. A man born to love her. A timeless moment in a world gone mad."

Giovanna (Sophia Loren) and Antonio (Marcello Mastroianni) marry to delay Antonio's deployment during World War II.   After that buys them twelve days of happiness, they try another scheme, in which Antonio pretends to be a crazy man. Finally, Antonio is sent to the Russian Front.  When the war is over, Antonio does not return and is listed as missing in action.  Despite the odds, Giovanna is convinced her true love has survived the war and is still in the Soviet Union. Determined, she journeys to the Soviet Union to find him.

In the Soviet Union, Giovanna visits the sunflower fields, where there is supposedly one flower for each fallen Italian soldier, and where the Germans forced the Italians to dig their own mass graves. Eventually, Giovanna finds Antonio, but by now he has started a second family with a woman who saved his life, and they have one daughter. Childless, having been faithful to her husband, Giovanna returns to Italy, heartbroken, but unwilling to disrupt her love's new life. Some years later, Antonio returns to Giovanna, asking her to come back with him to the Soviet Union. Meanwhile, Giovanna has tried to move on with her own life, moving out of their first home together and into her own apartment. She works in a factory and is living with a man, with whom she has a baby boy. Antonio visits her and tries to explain  his new life, how war changes a man, how safe he felt with his new woman after years of death. Unwilling to ruin Antonio's daughter's or her own new son's life, Giovanna refuses to leave Italy. As they part, Antonio gives her a fur, which he had promised years before that he'd bring back for her. The lovers lock eyes as Antonio's train takes him away from Giovanna, and from Italy, forever.

Cast 

 Sophia Loren – Giovanna
 Marcello Mastroianni – Antonio
 Lyudmila Savelyeva – Masha (Maria)
 Galina Andreyeva – Valentina, Soviet official
 Anna Carena – Antonio's mother
 Germano Longo – Ettore
 Nadya Serednichenko – Woman in sunflower fields
 Glauco Onorato – Returning soldier
 Silvano Tranquilli – Italian worker in Russia
 Marisa Traversi – Prostitute
 Gunars Cilinskis – Russian Ministry Official
 Carlo Ponti, Jr. – Giovanna's baby
 Pippo Starnazza – Italian official
 Dino Peretti
 Giorgio Basso

Release
The film was released on Saint Joseph's Day, 19 March 1970, in 5 key cities in Italy. It expanded to an additional 13 cities at Easter. It was the first Italian film to be dubbed and screened at Radio City Music Hall in New York City.

Reception
In its first 2½ months on release in Italy, it earned theatrical rentals of $1 million.

Soundtrack

Track listing

SIDE A 
01. Love Theme From "Sunflower" (2:26)
02. Masha's Theme (1:54)
03. Giovanna (1:54)
04. The Search (4:20)
05. Love In The Sand (Love Theme From "Sunflower") (3:00)
06. New Home In Moscow (1:20)

SIDE B 
07. Two Girls ("Masha's Theme And Love Theme From "Sunflower") (2:07)
08. The Retreat (5:10)
09. The Invitation (2:04)
10. Masha Finds Antonio (Masha's Theme)	(3:35)
11. The Parting In Milan (Love Theme From "Sunflower") (3:23)

Awards 

 David di Donatello: Best Actress (Sophia Loren)
 Academy Award nomination for Best Music, Original Score

References

External links 
 

Mosfilm films
1970 drama films
1970 films
1970 multilingual films
Films directed by Vittorio De Sica
Films set in Italy
Films set in Russia
Films about the Battle of Stalingrad
1970s Italian-language films
1970s Russian-language films
Films scored by Henry Mancini
Films with screenplays by Cesare Zavattini
Italian multilingual films
Soviet multilingual films
Films shot in Russia
Soviet World War II films
Russian World War II films
Italian World War II films
1970s Italian films